The Presidio Santa Cruz de Terrenate is a former Spanish military presidio, or fortress, located roughly west of the town of Tombstone, Arizona, in the United States of America.

History 
The Presidio Santa Cruz de Terrenate was established on a bluff overlooking the San Pedro River by an Irish-born Spanish Army Colonel, Hugo Oconór (Hugh O'Conor), in 1775, for the King of Spain Charles III. This is one of the best preserved sites from among the chain of similar presidios that extended from Los Adaes, Louisiana, in the east to Alta California in the west. Like all frontier presidios in the Viceroyalty of New Spain, Santa Cruz de Terrenate was garrisoned by soldados de cuera. The presidio was never completed to specifications due to the attacks of the Apache, administrative greed, corruption and poor morale.
The failure of the presidio was due to numerous problems like the lack of crops, raids on the horse herds, surprise attacks on the mule trains carrying supplies, and the continuous attacks by Apache directly on the fortress. These contributed to the abandonment of the garrison in 1780. In 1878, the presidio was briefly occupied by the United States Army but abandoned later that same year.

In 1951, Charles DiPeso excavated the site and reported that he believed that the evidence found on site indicated that O'Conor had located the presidio over the abandoned Sobaipuri Indian village of Quiburi. Other historians and archaeologists support a counter theory that the structures found at the site correspond to the quarters of the soldiers and families of the presidio (Gerald 1968; Seymour 1989). One reason for this later opinion is that the Sobaipuri Indians did not occupy adobe walled structures as their residences. Secondly, the historic record does not place Quiburi in this location. In fact, Santa Cruz is the name of the Sobaipuri settlement located here prior to presidio construction and provided the basis for the name of the presidio (SANTA CRUZ de Terrenate) and ultimately for the Santa Cruz River (Seymour 2011, 2012, 2013, 2014).

More recently, in 2007 through 2010, archaeologist Deni Seymour excavated portions of the site not initially investigated by DiPeso. She also reexamined some of the features and artifacts excavated by DiPeso and obtained chronometric dates on features to settle some of the feature-dating issues. Evidence showed that there was a Sobaipuri site present that predated the presidio but historical documents indicate it was not Quiburi (Seymour 1989, 2011, 2013, 2014). Additionally, Hohokam and Archaic occupations were also in evidence preceding the occupation of the presidio.  Evidence of the prehistoric Hohokam occupation consists of sherds scattered on the surface, and eroding out of the adobe walls of the later Spanish presidio. Archaic points and tools are present on the surface, in adobe walls, and in house fills, having eroded from the citadel walls.

References

Sources
 Di Peso, Charles  1953 "The Sobaipuri Indians of the Upper San Pedro River Valley, Southwestern Arizona".  Dragoon, AZ:  Amerind Foundation Publication No. 6.
 Gerald, Rex E. 1968 "Spanish Presidios of the Late Eighteenth Century in Northern New Spain". Museum of New Mexico Research Records, Number 7. Museum of New Mexico Press, Santa Fe.
 Seymour, Deni J. 1989 "The Dynamics of Sobaipuri Settlement in the Eastern Pimeria Alta". Journal of the Southwest 31(2):205–22.
 Seymour, Deni J.  2011 "Where the Earth and Sky are Sewn Together: Sobaípuri-O’odham Contexts of Contact and Colonialism". University of Utah Press, SLC.
 Seymour, Deni J.  2012 "Santa Cruz River: The Origin of a Place Name". Journal of Arizona History 53(1):81–88.
 Seymour, Deni J.  2013 "San Pablo de Quiburi: The Sobaípuri-O'odham Ranchería of Kino's Conception". New Mexico Historical Review.
 Seymour, Deni J.  2014 "Evaluating Di Peso's 1767 Jesuit Mission at Santa Cruz de Terrenate Presidio". Journal of the Southwest.
 Seymour, Deni J.  2014 "A Fateful Day in 1698: The Remarkable Sobaípuri O’odham Victory over the Enemies of the Sonoran Province". University of Utah Press, SLC.

External links 

 
 Santa Cruz de Terrenate Presidio Revisited, 2007–2008 Field Season
 Santa Cruz de Terrenate Presidio, 2008–2009 Field Season
 Santa Cruz de Terrenate Presidio, 2010 Field Season
 Captain Tovar's 1776 Battle of Las Mesitas – A Revised Perspective

Archaeological sites in Arizona
Buildings and structures in Cochise County, Arizona
History of Cochise County, Arizona
Santa Cruz
San Pedro Valley (Arizona)
1776 establishments in New Spain